FatCat Records is an English independent record label based in Brighton. The label's output reaches into many styles including experimental rock, electronica, psychedelic folk, contemporary classical, noise and post-punk. Notable artists that have released music on the label include Sigur Rós, Múm, Animal Collective, Frightened Rabbit, Shopping, The Twilight Sad, Vashti Bunyan and We Were Promised Jetpacks.

History

1989–2001
FatCat originally began in 1989 as a record store in Crawley, West Sussex, formed by Alex Knight, Dave Cawley and Andy Martin. It moved to central London in 1990, and originally specialised in Detroit and Chicago-based techno and house music. The store closed down in 1997, and the record label was born in its place, initially releasing dance and electronic 12"s.

The label moved to Brighton in 2001.

2000s
As well as Sigur Rós, another Icelandic band, Múm, were signed and proved successful for the label. The same year also saw the establishment of the 130701 imprint for the Set Fire To Flames album Sings Reign Rebuilder. A home for "post-classical" music, the imprint was later appended with the signing of pianist / composers, Sylvain Chauveau, Max Richter and Hauschka. In the same period FatCat consolidated its roster with the inclusion of artists like David Grubbs, Giddy Motors, and Party of One.

The departure of Sigur Rós to EMI in late 2004 lead to the label going back to being entirely independent. In 2005, FatCat expanded its set-up with the establishment of a US office in New York, and with the FatCat Publishing arm. That same year saw the release of Vashti Bunyan's Lookaftering album. Besides picking up European licenses in Vetiver and Blood On The Wall, the label also signed singer / songwriter Nina Nastasia, as well as new acts like Tom Brosseau, David Karsten Daniels, No Age, The Rank Deluxe, and Songs Of Green Pheasant around this time. In 2007, FatCat put out the first FatCat DVD release by audiovisual artists Semiconductor, who had previously worked on videos for Múm and QT?, as well as taking part in a number of FatCat showcases.

2010s
In 2012, the project of Meghan Remy, U.S Girls released FatCat debut LP Gem and later signed to 4AD to release her second album Half Free.

2013 saw TRAAMS release their debut FatCat release. In the same year TRAAMS released their debut LP Grin and their follow-up LP Modern Dancing was released in 2015.

In 2014 The Twilight Sad released their fourth studio album Nobody Wants To Be Here & Nobody Wants to Leave to critical acclaim and a 10/10 review from Drowned In Sound.

In 2015, Scottish composer and musician C Duncan released his debut album Architect which was later nominated for the Mercury Prize.

In 2016, FatCat signed Tall Ships. Numerous complications after the release of their debut album caused a three-year hiatus. The band returned with their second album Impressions in 2017 and marked a move away from a math-rock sound and towards a more alternative-rock sound. Also in 2016, Honeyblood released their second album Babes Never Die and C Duncan also released his second album The Midnight Sun, both to critical acclaim.

Also in 2016, 130171 released albums by a new roster of artists including Resina, Ian William Craig and Dmitry Evgrafov. Ian William Craig's album Centres was released to critical acclaim and placements on numerous critics end of year lists including Mojo, NY Times and Rolling Stone.

In 2017, 130701 released Fiction/Non Fiction, the debut album from Montreal-based composer Olivier Alary

Series and sublabels

FatCat has several 'series' they release music across: Splinter Series, Split Series, 8” Series, and E-RMX, amongst others. They also have a sublabel called 130701, which was set up to release more orchestrated and instrumental material.

Artists

Current roster of artists

 Best Friends
 Big Deal
 Breton
 C Duncan
 Dead Gaze
 Dmitry Evgrafov
 Dustin O’Halloran
 Emilie Levienaise-Farrouch
 Forest Fire
 Hauschka
 His Clancyness
 Honeyblood
 Ian William Craig
 Johannes Malfatti
 Knightstown
 Maps & Atlases
 Max Richter
 Mazes
 Mice Parade
 Milk Maid
 Nina Nastasia
 Olivier Alary
 Paws
 Resina
 Samana
 Shopping
 Tal National
 Tall Ships
 The Twilight Sad
 TRAAMS
 Vashti Bunyan
 We Were Promised Jetpacks

Alumni

 Amandine
 Animal Collective
 Aoki Takamasa + Tujiko Noriko
 The Balky Mule
 Björk mit Funkstörung
 Black Dice
 Blood on the Wall
 Brakes
 Charlottefield
 Chib
 Crescent
 David Grubbs
 David Karsten Daniels
 Di Lacuna
 Dorine Muraille
 Dr. Smith & Professor Ludlow
 Drowsy
 Ensemble
 Foehn
 Fonn
 Frightened Rabbit
 Get Back Guinozzi!
 Giddy Motors
 Grain
 Gregory and the Hawk
 Grindverk
 HiM
 Hondo Straight
 Immense
 Insync v Mysteron
 Janek Schaefer
 Jóhann Jóhannsson
 Kemialliset Ystävät
 Live Human
 múm
 No Age
 Panda Bear
 Party of One
 Pimmon
 Process
 Programme
 Psychedelic Horseshit
 Odonis Odonis
 Olivier Alary Ensemble
 Our Brother The Native
 Semiconductor
 Set Fire To Flames
 Sigur Rós
 Silje Nes
 Songs of Green Pheasant
 Sons of the Sun
 Storsveit Nix Noltes
 Stromba
 Sunroof!
 Sylvain Chauveau
 Ten Kens
 Tom Brosseau
 The Balky Mule
 The Bug
 The Dylan Group
 The Rank Deluxe
 The Realistics
 The Twilight Sad
 To Rococo Rot
 Transient Waves
 Ultra-red
 Vetiver
 Web
 Welcome
 Xinlisupreme

See also
 List of record labels

References

External links
 
 

Record labels established in 1997
Alternative rock record labels
British independent record labels
Indie rock record labels